Adrian Grünberg is an American film director and screenwriter.

Grünberg is known for directing and co-writing the film Get the Gringo (2012). He has also worked as first assistant director for films such as Mel Gibson's Apocalypto (2006), Oliver Stone's Wall Street: Money Never Sleeps (2010) and Martin Campbell's Edge of Darkness (2010). In 2019, he directed Rambo: Last Blood, the fifth film in its franchise.

Filmography
Film

Television

References

External links
 

Action film directors
American film directors
American male screenwriters
Living people
English-language film directors
Year of birth missing (living people)